The 91st Pennsylvania House of Representatives District is located in South Central Pennsylvania and has been represented by Dan Moul since 2007.

District profile
The 91st District is located in Adams County and includes the following areas: 

Bonneauville
Carroll Valley
Conewago Township
Cumberland Township
Fairfield
Franklin Township
Freedom Township
Germany Township
Gettysburg
Hamiltonban Township
Highland Township
Liberty Township
Littlestown
McSherrystown
Mount Joy Township
Mount Pleasant Township
Straban Township
Union Township

Representatives

References

Government of Adams County, Pennsylvania
91